On September 13, 2011, a special election was held in Nevada's 2nd congressional district to fill the vacancy created by the resignation of Republican Dean Heller, who was appointed to the United States Senate.

The race was called for Mark Amodei by the Associated Press just after 10 p.m. local time with 44% of precincts reporting and Amodei leading Marshall 57% to 37%.  Amodei easily won the election by a margin of 58% to 36%.

Rules
On May 2, 2011, Nevada Secretary of State Ross Miller announced the election, held under an untested 2003 law for replacing House members, would be open to any and all qualified candidates, without primary elections or nominations made by parties' central committees.

The Republican Party filed suit challenging Miller's plan, preferring instead that each party be required to nominate a single candidate. The party's complaint stated that "A fundamental principle of Nevada's electoral statutes is that, in a partisan election, there shall be only one nominee from each political party." On May 19, District Judge Todd Russell sided with the Republican Party and ruling that the major parties would hold conventions in order to each nominate a single candidate. Miller asked the office of the Nevada Attorney General to appeal the case to the Supreme Court of Nevada, which on May 31 issued an order instructing Miller and the state's political parties to address whether the election can be rescheduled due to concerns that the ongoing dispute over its rules may necessitate a delay.

Democratic nomination

Nominee
 Kate Marshall, Nevada State Treasurer

Declared candidates
 George S. Bay
 Chad Dehne, U.S. Marine Corps veteran
 Blake Franzman
 R. J. Gillum
 Zach Jones
 Kate Marshall, Nevada State Treasurer
 Jacques Maye
 Nancy Price, former regent of the Nevada System of Higher Education and unsuccessful candidate for the 2nd district in 2010
 Rex Ricks

Declined to run

 Jill Derby, former regent of the Nevada System of Higher Education and unsuccessful candidate for the 2nd district in 2006 and 2008

Republican nomination
The central committee of the Nevada Republican Party voted to decide the Republican nominee in June 2011. Any Republican who receives at least two votes from members of the central committee can compete in the nomination process, which will be held under a two-round system.

Nominee
 Mark Amodei, state party chairman and former State Senator

Declared candidates
 Mark Amodei, state party chairman and former State Senator
 Greg Brower, State Senator and former United States Attorney
 Hal Carmack
 Guy Felton
 William R. Graves
 Edward Hamilton, perennial candidate
 Ryan Henderson, optician
 Greg Hudson
 Robert X. Leeds
 Kirk Lippold, former USS Cole commander
 Daniel Miller
 Troy "Gunny" Orosco
 Phillip D. Telander
 Busch Voigts, Jr.
 Jonathan M. Yuspa
 Sidney Zeller, U.S. Marine Corps veteran

Declined to run
 Sharron Angle, former member of the Nevada Assembly and 2010 Republican nominee for the U.S. Senate
 Brian Krolicki, Lieutenant Governor of Nevada

Independent American Party nomination

Declared candidates
 Timothy Fasano

Independent candidates
 Earl Ammerman
 Roland Lee
 Helmuth Lehmann, businessman and author
 Christopher Simon

General election

Polling

  Commissioned by Daily Kos and the SEIU

Results

See also
List of special elections to the United States House of Representatives
United States House of Representatives elections in Nevada, 2012

References

External links
 Mark Amodei campaign website
 Earl Ammerman campaign website
 Greg Brower campaign website
 Chad Dehne campaign website
 Timothy Fasano campaign website
 Guy Felton campaign website
 Ryan Henderson campaign website
 Helmuth Lehmann campaign website
 Kirk Lippold campaign website
 Kate Marshall campaign website
 Nancy Price campaign website
 Rex Ricks campaign website
 Sidney Zeller campaign website

2nd congressional district special election
Nevada 2
2011 2 special
Nevada 2
Nevada 2
United States House of Representatives 2001 2